

See also
 Florida
 List of municipalities in Florida
 List of former municipalities in Florida
 List of counties in Florida
 List of census-designated places in Florida

References
USGS Fips55 database